Kupferbach (also: Töpener Bach or Töpenbach) is a river of Thuringia and Bavaria, Germany. It is a tributary of the Tannbach near Töpen.

See also
List of rivers of Thuringia
List of rivers of Bavaria

References

Rivers of Thuringia
Rivers of Bavaria
Rivers of Germany